Irina-Camelia Begu and Elena Bogdan were the defending champions, and successfully defended their title by defeating Maria Elena Camerin and İpek Şenoğlu in the final, 6–7(1–7), 7–6(7–4), [16–14]

Seeds

Draw

References
 Doubles Draw

BCR Open Romania Ladies - Doubles
BCR Open Romania Ladies